Sir Cecil William Francis Stafford-King-Harman, 2nd Baronet (6 December 1895–1987) was an Anglo-Irish landowner and soldier. 

He was born Cecil Stafford, the second son of Sir Thomas Stafford, 1st Baronet and his wife, Frances Agnes, daughter of Edward King-Harman. In 1933 Cecil added his mother's surname to his father's. His elder brother, Edward Charles Stafford King Harman, was killed in the First World War.

Cecil graduated from Oxford, receiving an M.A. in agriculture in 1922. He married Sarah Beatrice Acland, daughter of Alfred Dyke Acland. Their son Thomas Edward Stafford-King-Harman (1921–1944) was killed in the Normandy Campaign. Their daughters were MI6 agent Joan Stafford-King-Harman (1918–2018) and artist Ann Stafford King-Harman (1919–1969). On his father's death in 1935, Cecil succeeded to the baronetcy; it became extinct on his death in 1987.

In 1937 he followed his father as a steward of the Irish Turf Club. He was a member of the Church of Ireland and from 1939 a lay member of the diocesan synod for Kilmore, Elphin and Ardagh. Previously a captain in the yeomanry, during the Second World War Stafford-King-Harman served in the King's Royal Rifle Corps from 7 May 1940 until 2 April 1943, when as temporary lieutenant-colonel he relinquished his command due to ill health and was granted honorary rank of major. 

After the death of Sir John Keane in 1956, Seán T. O'Kelly, the President of Ireland, appointed Stafford-King-Harman to the Council of State. The family estate was the Rockingham Estate in the north of County Roscommon. The house was gutted by fire in September 1957 while Stafford-King-Harman was at Doncaster Racecourse. It was bought by the Land Commission and much of it is now Lough Key Forest Park.

References

Further reading
 

1895 births
1987 deaths
20th-century Anglo-Irish people
20th-century Irish landowners
Presidential appointees to the Council of State (Ireland)
King's Royal Rifle Corps officers
British Army personnel of World War II
People in horse racing
People from County Roscommon
Baronets in the Baronetage of the United Kingdom
Irish Anglicans
Alumni of the University of Oxford